Dillon Gymnasium is an on-campus multi-purpose athletic facility on the campus of Princeton University in Princeton, New Jersey.  It was built in 1947 to replace University Gymnasium, which had burned to the ground in 1944.  It houses a 1,500-seat gymnasium, squash courts and a pool.

From 1947 to 1969 it housed the men's basketball team before the building of Jadwin Gymnasium.  It currently houses the men's and women's volleyball teams and the wrestling team.  It is named for Herbert L. Dillon, class of 1907, a one-time football captain and a principal donor to the building which bears his name.

As the headquarters of Princeton University's Campus Recreation program, Dillon is also home to the  Stephens Fitness Center, a  Dance Studio, a  Martial Arts Room, and a Spinning Room with 14 bikes.

On 15 February 1964 Bill Bradley scored 51 points here in a basketball game for Princeton University, allowing Princeton to defeat Harvard University, 87-56, before 2,700 fans.

References

External links
 Dillon Gymnasium from Princeton.edu
 Dillon Gym - Princeton Athletics

Basketball venues in New Jersey
College volleyball venues in the United States
College wrestling venues in the United States
Defunct college basketball venues in the United States
Indoor arenas in New Jersey
Princeton Tigers men's basketball
Sports venues in New Jersey
Princeton University buildings
Sports venues on the National Register of Historic Places in New Jersey
Sports venues completed in 1947
1947 establishments in New Jersey